Isidoro Gallo is a Spain-based photographer. His work features photographs of travels and nature.  
He has some books: ("Sueños de Viajero" – 1997; "Tras la sombra de la Luna" – Shelios 2000; Photographs of "Pobreza, Desigualdad y  Desarrollo Humano" Ministry of Education of Cantabria 2006), catalogs (Tibet Vivo – 2001) and calendars (Tibet 2002; Bolivia 2004; New Zealand 2010).

Prizes and accesits:  
Sant Julia de Loria Photographic Marathon, 1994, 1996, 1997.
Accesit in the International NPCI Nikon Photo Contest 1996 Japan.
2nd Prize, Cantabria Nuestra 2000.
1st Prize XI Gallery Caja España 2001.
Accesit Photo, France 2001.
Photographic Contest, Rafaela Ibarra. Santander 2004.
Finalist Civilia Contest. Madrid 2004.
"Photographer of the year" 2006 award, City hall of Santander.
Fourth Prize Competition III "Ribeira Sacra" 2007.
Third Prize Competition 9th "Cantabria Nuestra" 2008.
1st Prize First Photo Contest "Vicente Ansola" 2009.

External links
 Isidoro Gallo Website

Living people
Spanish photographers
1952 births